This is a list of the largest shopping centres in the Nordic countries, comprising Finland, Sweden, Norway, Denmark and Iceland. All shopping centres over 50,000 m2 are shown.

See also 

 List of tallest buildings in Scandinavia
 List of stadiums in the Nordic countries by capacity

References 

Shopping centres in the Nordic countries
Largest shopping centres in the Nordic countries
Nordic countries
Retail buildings in Europe